The 1988 Currie Cup Division A (known as the Santam Bank Currie Cup for sponsorship reasons) was the top division of the Currie Cup competition, the premier domestic rugby union competition in South Africa. This was the 50th season since the competition started in 1889.

Teams

Competition

Regular season and title play-offs
There were seven participating teams in the 1988 Currie Cup Division A. These teams played each other twice over the course of the season, once at home and once away.
Teams received two points for a win and one points for a draw. The top two teams qualified for the title play-offs (along with the top team from Division B). In the semi-finals, the team that finished second had home advantage against the team that finished top of Division B, while the team that finished top had a bye through to the final. The final was then played at the home venue of the higher-placed team.

Relegation play-offs
The bottom team on the log qualified for the relegation play-offs. That team played off against the team placed top in Division B over two legs. The winner over these two ties qualified for the 1989 Currie Cup Division A, while the losing team qualified for the 1989 Currie Cup Division B.

Log

Fixtures and Results

Round one

Round two

Round three

Round four

Round Five

Round Six

Round Seven

Round Eight

Round Nine

Round Ten

Round Eleven

Round Twelve

Round Thirteen

Round Fourteen

Semi-final
As champions of Division B,  qualified to the semi-finals of the Currie Cup competition, where they met Division A runners-up .

Final

Relegation play-offs
In the relegation play-offs,  beat  on aggregate and won promotion to Division A.  were initially relegated, but Division A was expanded to 8 teams and they retained their place.

See also
 1988 Currie Cup Division B
 1988 Santam Bank Trophy Division A
 1988 Santam Bank Trophy Division B
 1988 Lion Cup

References

 A
1988